The Delta was a 12-cylinder inverted-V aircraft engine built by Isotta Fraschini prior to and during World War II.

Design and development
The Delta is a fairly rare example of a large air-cooled inline engine, which normally have cooling problems with the rearmost cylinders. It produced about 750 hp in common versions, although others were rated up to 900 hp. The Delta was not widely used, although it could be found on a number of production aircraft and some advanced prototypes.

The engine included a number of otherwise advanced features. For instance, the valves were powered by dual overhead cams driven by power shafts at the rear of the engine. Exhaust ports were arranged to exit toward the middle of the engine, one cylinder bank being the mirror of the other, allowing the piping to be ganged below the engine nacelle.

Variants
 Delta R.C.20/55 ID-IS
 Delta R.C.21/60
 Delta R.C.35
 Delta R.C.35 I
 Delta R.C.35 IS
 Delta R.C.40 IS
 Delta R.C.40 ID-IS
 Delta R.C.48
 Delta III R.C.40 
 Delta IV R.C.17/50

Applications

Ambrosini SAI.107 
Ambrosini SAI.207 prototype
Ambrosini SAI.403 prototype
CANT Z.515
Caproni Ca.313
Caproni Ca.314 
Caproni Ca.331  
Caudron C.714 (C.760) prototype
Henschel Hs 129 prototype
Reggiane Re.2001 prototype
 Savoia-Marchetti SM.86

Specifications (Delta RC35-IDS)
 
{{pistonspecs|

|ref=Aircraft engines of the World.
|type=12-cylinder air-cooled 60 degree inverted vee 
|bore=
|stroke=
|displacement=
|length= 
|width=     
|height=    
|weight=510 kg (1,124 lb)       
|valvetrain= Two poppet valves per cylinder, sodium cooled exhaust valves, double overhead camshafts
|supercharger=Single-stage, single-speed centrifugal type supercharger, gear ratio 9.8:1  
|fuelsystem=Four Isotta Fraschini downdraft carburetors
|fueltype=80/87 octane petrol (aviation gasoline)
|oilsystem=Dry sump, double scavenge pump, single pressure pump
|coolingsystem=Air-cooled
|power=
 at 2,600 rpm (take off)
 at 2,600 rpm at 
|specpower=21.5 kW/L (0.47 hp/in³)
|compression=6.4:1
|fuelcon= 
|specfuelcon= 270 grams/hp*hour maximum, 250 grams/hp*hour cruise (70%)
|oilcon=
|power/weight=1.1 kW/kg (0.68 hp/lb)
|reduction_gear= Ratio 0.64:1
}}

See also

References

Bibliography

Gunston, Bill. World Encyclopedia of Aero Engines. Cambridge, England. Patrick Stephens Limited, 1989. 
Jane's Fighting Aircraft of World War II. London. Studio Editions Ltd, 1989. 
 Wilkinson, Paul H. Aircraft engines of the World 1945. New York, Paul H. Wilkinson, 1945.

Delta
Aircraft air-cooled V piston engines
1920s aircraft piston engines
Inverted V12 aircraft engines